The Rt Rev Francis Ambrose Gregory (1848 - 31 January 1927) was a former Bishop of Mauritius.

Born into an ecclesiastical family  in 1848 and educated at Trinity College, Glenalmond and Corpus Christi College, Oxford, he was ordained in 1873 and began his career as a Curate  in Cheam.  After that he was a SPG Missionary in  Madagascar. In time he became the Principal of St Paul’s College, Ambatoharanana  and Chaplain to the Bishop. He was Bishop of Mauritius from 1904  to 1919.

He died on 31 January 1927 and is buried at Northiam Cemetery, East Sussex.

Notes

External links
Ny Boky Fivavahana Portions of the Book of Common Prayer in Malagasy (1904) translated by Gregory

1848 births
People educated at Glenalmond College
Alumni of Corpus Christi College, Oxford
English Anglican missionaries
20th-century Anglican bishops in Africa
Anglican bishops of Mauritius
1927 deaths
English chaplains
Anglican chaplains
British expatriates in Madagascar
British expatriates in Mauritius
British Mauritius people
Anglican missionaries in Madagascar